The 9N24 sub-munition is of Soviet-era design and is used most often with the OTR-21 Tochka, NATO reporting name SS-21 Scarab. This type of cluster bomb munition would be prevented by the 2008 Convention on Cluster Munitions were Russia to be a signatory, which it is not.

Technology

  
The body of 9N24 consists of 18 fragmentation rings with an explosive fill of А-IX-20 mixture, which is constituted by four parts phlegmatized RDX to one part aluminium powder.

The 9N24 uses a ribbon stabilizer.

Quantity 50 of the 9N24 sub-munitions are arrayed inside a 9N123K projectile.

References

Ammunition
Cluster munition
Submunitions